Harm "Harry" Sinkgraven (born 21 January 1966) is a Dutch association football coach and former professional player.

He managed Canadian soccer team FC Edmonton from December 2010 until he was released by the club in September 2012.

Career

Playing career
Born in Assen, Sinkgraven played for FC Groningen, SC Cambuur and FC Zwolle, making over 300 league career appearances.

Coaching career
Sinkgraven spent a number of years as Assistant Manager at FC Zwolle, before taking charge of the Indonesian Olympic team in 2006. Sinkgraven left a year later, returning to the Netherlands to coach at the women's football club of SC Heerenveen, before managing FC Emmen for a year.

Sinkgraven took charge of Canadian soccer team FC Edmonton in December 2010 until he was released by the club in September 2012.

Personal life
His son Daley is also a professional footballer.

References

External links
 

1966 births
Living people
Association football midfielders
Dutch footballers
Eredivisie players
Eerste Divisie players
FC Groningen players
SC Cambuur players
PEC Zwolle players
People from Assen
Dutch football managers
Dutch expatriate sportspeople in Canada
Expatriate soccer managers in Canada
North American Soccer League coaches
FC Edmonton coaches
PEC Zwolle non-playing staff
Expatriate football managers in Indonesia
Dutch expatriate sportspeople in Indonesia
Dutch expatriate football managers
SC Heerenveen (women) managers
Women's association football managers
Footballers from Drenthe